Darda can refer to:

Darda (philosopher), Phoenician philosopher, one of the exemplars of wisdom than whom Solomon was wiser
Rajendra Darda, Indian politician
Vijay J. Darda, Indian politician
 Darda, Croatia, a village and a municipality in eastern Croatia
Darda (toy), a car racing set made in Germany
Darda, a card game closely related to Klabberjass
Darda Turki, a village in the Tonk district of Rajasthan